Solid State Recital is the fifth studio album from Puressence. It was also their last album as they split two years after its release and associated tour. The album features Judy Collins on two tracks after she became friendly with the band when James Mudriczki covered her song Che for a tribute album to her.

Track listing
"Swathes of Sea Made Stone" 
"Burma" 
"When Your Eyes Close"
"Cape of No Hope (Water's Edge)" 
"Majesterial" 
"Solid State"
"Raise Me to the Ground" 
"In Harm's Way" 
"Another World"
"Our Number's Oracle"

Lineup

Musicians
James Mudriczki - vocals
Lowell Killen - guitar
Kevin Matthews - bass
Anthony Szuminski - drums
Judy Collins - vocals on tracks 1 & 3

References

2011 albums
Puressence albums